Shortridge's horseshoe bat (Rhinolophus shortridgei) is a species of Horseshoe bat native to Northeast India, northern Myanmar, and southern China. It was first described in 1918 by Knud Andersen, and was considered a subspecies of Blyth's horseshoe bat until 2003 when the two species were collected in sympatry.

Description

It is of medium size with a long mandible and a nose leaf which does not completely cover its nostril. It has brown fur with a relatively pale underside.

Range and conservation status
In China, the species is found in Yunnan, Sichuan, Guizhou, Hunan, Guangxi, Hubei, Hainan, Guangdong and Fujian provinces. It is also found in northern parts of India and in Myanmar. There is limited data on the habitat of R. shortridgei but specimens have been collected from a dipterocarp forest in Burma. Despite the lack of population data, IUCN has listed it as data deficient.

References

Rhinolophidae
Bats of Asia
Mammals of China
Bats of India
Mammals of Myanmar
Mammals described in 1918
Taxa named by Knud Andersen